Nationality words link to articles with information on the nation's poetry or literature (for instance, Irish or France).

Events

Oscar Wilde's arrest and conviction
 February 18 – John Douglas, 9th Marquess of Queensberry (father of Lord Alfred Douglas, Oscar Wilde's lover), leaves his calling card at the Albemarle Club in London, inscribed: "For Oscar Wilde, posing somdomite", i.e. a sodomite, inducing Wilde to charge him with criminal libel.
 April 3–5 – Libel case of Wilde v Queensberry at the Old Bailey in London: Queensberry is acquitted. Evidence of Wilde's homosexual relationships with young men renders him liable to criminal prosecution under the Labouchere Amendment, while the Libel Act 1843 renders him legally liable for the considerable expenses Queensberry has incurred in his defence, leaving Wilde penniless.
 April 6 – Wilde is arrested at the Cadogan Hotel, London, for "unlawfully committing acts of gross indecency with certain male persons" and detained on remand in Holloway Prison.
 May 25 – Criminal case of Regina v. Wilde: After a retrial at the Old Bailey, Wilde is convicted of gross indecency and is taken to Pentonville Prison to begin his two years' sentence of hard labour.
 November 21 – Wilde is transferred to Reading Gaol.

Other events
 December 19 – Robert Frost marries Elinor Miriam White at Lawrence, Massachusetts.
 Rudyard Kipling writes the poem If—.
 Ernest Thayer recites Casey at the Bat at a Harvard class reunion, resolving the "mystery" of the poem's authorship.

Works published in English

Canada
 Bliss Carman, A Seamark: A Threnody for Robert Louis Stevenson. Boston: Copeland & Day.
 Bliss Carman, Behind The Arras: A Book Of The Unseen. Illus. Tom B. Meteyard. Boston: Lamson, Wolffe.
 Sophia Almon Hensley, A Woman's Love Letters.
 Emily Pauline Johnson, The White Wampum, Toronto: Copp Clark; London: John Lane.
 Marie Joussaye, Songs that Quinte Sang.
 Archibald Lampman, Lyrics of Earth
 Arthur Stringer, Pauline and Other Poems.
 Agnes Ethelwyn Wetherald, The House of the Trees and Other Poems

United Kingdom
 Robert Bridges, Invocation to Music
 Gelett Burgess, "The Purple Cow"
 John Davidson, Fleet Street Eclogues, second series (first series, 1893)
 Austin Dobson, The Story of Rosina, and Other Verses
 Maurice Hewlett, A Masque of Dead Florentines
 Lionel Johnson, Poems
 William Morris, The Tale of Beowulf
 Coventry Patmore, The Rod, the Root, and the Flower
 Arthur Quiller-Couch, editor, The Golden Pomp, anthology of 16th- and 17th-century English lyricists
 Arthur Symons, London Nights
 James Thomson, Poetical Works, posthumously published; edited, with a memoir, by Bertram Dobell
 William Watson, The Father of the Forest, and Other Poems
 William Butler Yeats, Irish poet published in the United Kingdom:
 Editor, A Book of Irish Verse, anthology
 Poems, drama and poetry

United States
 Thomas Bailey Aldrich, Unguarded Gates
 Katharine Lee Bates, "Pikes Peak" a poem later set to music and becoming known as "America the Beautiful", originally published in the July 4 edition of The Congregationalist, a church periodical
 Orelia Key Bell, Poems
 Ina Coolbrith, Songs from the Golden Gate
 Stephen Crane, The Black Riders and Other Lines
 Paul Laurence Dunbar, Majors and Minors, including "We Wear the Mask"
 William Dean Howells, Stops of Various Quills
 James Russell Lowell, Last Poems, published posthumously
 James Whitcomb Riley, "Little Orphant Annie"
 Henry David Thoreau, Poems of Nature, published posthumously (died 1862)

Other in English
 Sri Aurobindo, Song to Myrtilla, Calcutta: Arya Publishing House; India, Indian poetry in English
 Banjo Paterson, The Man from Snowy River and Other Verses, major single-author collection of Australian bush poetry
 William Butler Yeats, Irish poet published in the United Kingdom:
 Editor, A Book of Irish Verse, anthology
 Poems, drama and poetry

Works published in other languages
 José Santos Chocano, Peru:
 En la aldea ("In the Village")
 Iras santas
 Francis Jammes, Un jour, France
 Catulle Mendès, La Grive des vignes, France
 Władysław Mickiewicz, Vie d'Adam Mickiewicz ("Life of Adam Mickiewicz"), four volumes, Poznań, Poland, published beginning 1890 through this year; published by the poet's son
 K. C. Kesava Pillai, Asanna-Marana Chinta Satakam, lyric in the form of a monologue of a man about to die, Indian, Malayalam-language
 Émile Verhaeren, Les villes tentaculaires ("The tentacular towns"), Belgium, French language
 Verner von Heidenstam, Dikter ("Poems"), Sweden
 Manilal Dwivedi, Atmanimajjan, a collection of Gujarati language poems.

Awards and honors

Births
Death years link to the corresponding "[year] in poetry" article:
 February 18 – Lazarus Aaronson (died 1966), English poet and academic economist
 April 18 – W. E. Harney (died 1962), Australian
 May 2 – Lorenz Hart (died 1943), American lyricist
 May 19 – Charles Hamilton Sorley (died 1915), Scots poet
 May 28 – Gamel Woolsey, born Elizabeth (Elsa) Gammell Woolsey (died 1968 in Spain), American poet and writer
 June 3 – Robert Hillyer (died 1961), American poet and academic
 July 22 – León de Greiff (died 1976), Colombian poet
 July 24 – Robert Graves (died 1985), English poet, translator and novelist
 September 10 – Viswanatha Satyanarayana (died 1976), Indian poet writing in Telugu; popularly known as the Kavi Samraat ("Emperor of Poetry")
 September 22 – Babette Deutsch (died 1982), American poet, critic, translator and novelist
 September 28 – Edward Harrington (died 1966), Australian poet, writer of Bush ballads
 November 1 – David Jones, born Walter David Michael Jones (died 1974), English (Welsh-descended) artist and poet
 November 25 – Helen Hooven Santmyer, American poet and author (d. 1986)
 December 14 – Paul Éluard (died 1952), French poet, a founder of Surrealism
 December 23 – Lilian Bowes Lyon (died 1949), English poet, a cousin of Queen Elizabeth The Queen Mother
 Unknown dates
 Padmadhar Chaliha (died 1969), Indian, Assamese-language poet
 Max Dunn (died 1963), Irish-born Australian
 Khavirakpan (died 1950), Indian, Meitei language poet

Deaths
Birth years link to the corresponding "[year] in poetry" article:
 April 17 – Jorge Isaacs (born 1837), Colombian writer, politician and explorer
 May 30 – Frederick Locker-Lampson (born 1821), English writer and poet
 June 29 – Thomas Henry Huxley (born 1825), English controversialist, academic, scientist and occasional poet
 October 7 – William Wetmore Story (born 1819), American  sculptor, art critic, poet and editor
 October 12 – Cecil Frances Alexander (born 1818), Irish hymn-writer and poet
 October 21 – Louisa Anne Meredith (born 1812), Australian
 November 4 – Eugene Field (born 1850), American writer best known for children's poetry and humorous essays
 November 22 – John Warren, 3rd Baron de Tabley (born 1835), English
 November 28 – Louisa Sarah Bevington (born 1845), English poet and anarchist

See also

 19th century in poetry
 19th century in literature
 List of years in poetry
 List of years in literature
 Victorian literature
 French literature of the 19th century
 Symbolist poetry
 Young Poland (Młoda Polska) a modernist period in Polish  arts and literature, roughly from 1890 to 1918
 Poetry

Notes

19th-century poetry
Poetry